Aamne Samne is a 1967 Hindi mystery film produced and directed by Suraj Prakash. The film stars Shashi Kapoor, Sharmila Tagore, Prem Chopra, Rajindernath and Madan Puri. The film's music is by Kalyanji Anandji.

Plot
Deepak Verma (Shashi Kapoor) is on trial for the murder of his wealthy wife Vimla, but is acquitted and set free. Deepak gets possession of all his wife's wealth and sets out to Bombay and starts a new life under the alias Gopal Mittal. Sapna (Sharmila Tagore) is his wealthy neighbor who finds Gopal annoying and believes that Gopal is stalking her. Soon, Sapna falls for Gopal's charms, though her brother Pran (Madan Puri) wants Sapna to marry Prem (Prem Chopra). Sapna tells Prem and Pran that she is choosing Gopal, which enrages them and they both threaten to kill her. Sapna and Gopal get married and while honeymooning, an attempt is made on Sapna's life. Soon, Sapna learns that Gopal's real name is Deepak, who was previously accused of murdering his first wife. Gopal's ever changing behavior throws everyone into suspicion and Sapna fears she will be his next victim. Is Gopal innocent or Guilty? Who is spinning the web of lie and deceit and who will survive the murderer's cruel intentions?

Cast
 Shashi Kapoor as Deepak Verma / Gopal Mittal
 Sharmila Tagore as Sapna Mathur / Sapna G. Mittal
 Prem Chopra as Prem Malhotra
 Madan Puri as Pran Mathur, Sapna's brother
 Kamal Kapoor as Inspector Varma
 Rajendra Nath as Shubodh Mukherjee
 Shammi as Itabai Mukherji, Shubodh's wife
 Karan Dewan as Jeeva
 Bhalla as Chander - Malhotra's servant

Soundtrack

References

External links 
 

1967 films
1960s Hindi-language films
Films scored by Kalyanji Anandji